Symbiosis University of Applied Sciences is a private university in Indore, Madhya Pradesh, India. It was established in 2016.

About

Symbiosis University of Applied Sciences is a self-financed university established by the Government of Madhya Pradesh Gazette, No 2 of 2016 dated 13 June 2016, under the provisions of MP Niji Vishwavidyalaya Adhiniyam 2007.

The University offers short-term, skill-based courses as well as degree programs in high growth sectors of automobile, construction, IT, mechatronics, retail, BFSI, pharmacy and health sciences.

The University has collaborated with industries in India and a German university of applied sciences.

The University has imported specialized skill training machinery from Germany to impart hands-on practical training to its students.

Undergraduate studies

 Bachelor of Technology in Computer Science and Information Technology
 Bachelor of Technology in Mechatronics Engineering
 Bachelor Of Business Administration in Retail and E-Commerce Management
 Bachelor Of Business Administration in Banking, Financial Services and Insurance Management

Postgraduate studies

 Master of Business Administration in Banking, Financial Services and Insurance Management
 Executive MBA

References

External links

Private universities in India
Educational institutions established in 2016
2016 establishments in Madhya Pradesh